François Bédarida, (14 March 1926 in Lyons – 16 September 2001 in Fontaine-le-Port) was a French academic historian. His work centred on Victorian England and France in WWII. He made significant research contributions to the study of The Holocaust. He was a director of the Maison française in Oxford among other leadership roles.

Life 
François Bédarida was born into a family of Catholic intellectuals. His father, Henri Bédarida, was a specialist in Italian studies and professor at the Sorbonne. François attended the Lycée Montaigne (Paris), the Lycée Louis-le-Grand and the Lycée Henri-IV where he was deemed a brilliant student.

French Resistance 
During the Occupation of France, his father gave sanctuary to the Catholic priest, Pierre Chaillet SJ. The youthful Bédarida was actively involved in the French Resistance and joined the Christian Témoignage chrétien movement where he met his future wife, Renée Bédarida.

Academic career 

In 1946 he resumed his education and entered the École normale supérieure in Paris and in 1949 graduated in History after a brief stint teaching at the Lycée Thiers in Marseilles. His doctoral thesis was on the Catholic population in London at the end of the 19th-century. François Bédarida then left for London to teach and carry out research at the French Institute during 1950-1956.
In 1956 on his return to France, he became an associate of the CNRS (1956-1959). Then followed a period of five years as Assistant professor in Modern and Contemporary History at the Sorbonne. In 1966 he was appointed head of the Maison Française in Oxford, whose first permanent home he launched and opened in the presence of French Culture Minister, André Malraux. Between 1971 and 1978 he was master of conferences at the Institut d'etudes politiques de Paris. He became Director of research at the CNRS in 1979. He was a founder and first director of the Institut d'histoire du temps présent, from 1978 to 1990, and between 1990 and 2000 he held the post of General Secretary of the International Committee of Historical Sciences (ICHS/CIHS).

Historian of Victorian England and France under Vichy 
François Bédarida's first studies were into Victorian England. Notable among his work was a study of Will Thorne. In the 1970s he changed tack and researched Vichy France and its antidemocratic political philosophy. Beside the work of the American historian, Robert Paxton among a few others, he exposed the nature and ideology of the régime of Pétain. Prior to that, for thirty years the Vichy administration was seen merely as an adjunct of the Third Reich. He thereby locked into the two responsibilities of the historian in relation to that particular period, to perpetuate the role of the Resistance movement, and to establish scientifically the truth about events in order to avoid the creation of myths about that time. He collaborated with several authors in a number of publications on The Holocaust, notably with Jean-Pierre Azéma and his own wife, Renée Bédarida.

Selected works 
in French:
 La Grande-Bretagne - L'Angleterre triomphante (1832-1914), Hatier, coll. « Histoire Contemporaine », Paris, 1974
  |url=https://www.journals.uchicago.edu/doi/abs/10.1086/242250}}
 Syndicats et patrons en Grande-Bretagne (with Éric Giuily and Gérard Rameix). Éditions de l'Atelier, 1980
 
 La Politique nazie d'extermination, Albin Michel, Paris, 1989
 La Société anglaise du milieu du 19è siècle à nos jours (1851-1975), Seuil, Paris, 1990
 Le Nazisme et le génocide – Histoire et enjeux, Nathan, Paris, 1991
 Le Nazisme et le génocide – Histoire et témoignage, Pocket, Paris, 1992
 Le régime de Vichy et les Français, 1992 (with Jean-Pierre Azéma)
 La France des années noires, Azéma, Jean-Pierre and Bédarida, François (eds.) 2 vol., Paris, Seuil, 1993 [rééd. Seuil, 2000 (Points Histoire)]
 
 L'Histoire et le métier d'historien en France 1945-1995, Éditions de la Maison des sciences de l'homme, Paris, 1995
 Churchill, Fayard, Paris, 1999, 
 Histoire, critique et responsabilité, IHTP-CNRS/Complexe, coll. « Histoire du temps présent », Paris/Bruxelles, 2003
  Preface to Les Témoins de Jéhovah face à Hitler by Guy Canonici Éditions Albin Michel S.A. 1998

in English:
 
 A social history of England, 1851–1990, Routledge, 1991, 
in Spanish:
 Bédarida, François (1998). "Definición, método y práctica de la Historia del Tiempo Presente", Cuadernos de Historia Contemporánea 20:19-27.

Awards 
 Honorary MA from the University of Oxford 1966
 Prix Mémoire de la Shoah 1992
 Chevalier de la Legion d'honneur
 Officier du Mérite (1999)
 Prix de la Fondation Pierre-Lafue, 2000

Legacy 
The collected papers of François Bédarida are stored at the Archives nationales, on the site of Pierrefitte-sur-Seine, under code 673AP

See also 
 List of contemporary French historians

Notes and references

External links
 Bédarida's authorship and citations on the Persée portal (in French)
 tribute to François Bédarida in English
 inventaire du fonds, archival catalogue

1926 births
2001 deaths
Academics of the University of Oxford
20th-century French historians
20th-century French male writers
20th-century French non-fiction writers
20th-century linguists
Writers from Paris
French Resistance members
French Roman Catholic writers
Lycée Louis-le-Grand alumni
École Normale Supérieure alumni
French male writers
French people of World War II
Anti-German sentiment
Historians of the British Isles
Historians of England
Historians of fascism
Historians of Nazism
Historians of Vichy France
Historians of World War II
Social historians
Writers on antisemitism
Scholars of antisemitism
French social commentators
Recipients of the Ordre national du Mérite
Research directors of the French National Centre for Scientific Research